The Futureheads is the debut studio album by British indie rock band The Futureheads. It was released on 12 July 2004 and spawned the singles "First Day", "Decent Days and Nights", "Meantime", and "Hounds of Love" (a Kate Bush cover). The album received critical praise and was re-released as a special edition in 2005 featuring a DVD and coming with a slightly re-designed cover in pink rather than the standard LP's grey.

"Decent Days and Nights" and "Hounds of Love" were made available for the Rock Band platform on 9 March 2010. "Decent Days and Nights" also appeared on the Burnout 3 soundtrack. "Meantime" was used in a second season episode of the hit TV series The O.C., and the film, Grandma's Boy.

The album was named the 33rd best record of 2004 by Pitchfork.

Track listing
All songs written by The Futureheads, unless otherwise stated.

"Le Garage" – 1:45
"Robot" – 2:00
"A to B" – 2:27
"Decent Days and Nights" – 2:31
"Meantime" – 2:50
"Alms" – 2:05
"Danger of the Water" – 2:57
"Carnival Kids" – 2:44
"The City Is Here for You to Use" – 2:35
"First Day" – 2:04
"He Knows" – 3:13
"Stupid and Shallow" – 1:34
"Trying Not to Think About Time" – 2:24
"Hounds of Love" (Kate Bush) – 3:02
"Man Ray" – 2:18

Special edition bonus tracks
"Decent Days and Nights" (Radio Mix) – 2:42
"Hounds of Love" (Radio Mix) – 3:05

Charts

References

2004 debut albums
679 Artists albums
Albums produced by Paul Epworth
Sire Records albums
The Futureheads albums
Albums produced by Andy Gill